The 2014 Senior Open Championship was a senior major golf championship and the 28th Senior Open Championship, held 24–27 July at Royal Porthcawl Golf Club in Porthcawl, Wales. It was the first Senior Open Championship played at the course and the 12th Senior Open Championship played as a senior major championship.

World Golf Hall of Fame member Bernhard Langer led wire-to-wire and broke the tournament scoring record, finishing at 18-under-par. The 2014 event was Langer's second Senior Open Championship title and his fourth senior major championship victory.

Venue

The 2014 event was the first Senior Open Championship played at Royal Porthcawl. Royal Porthcawl hosted the Senior Open Championship for a second time in 2017.

Course layout

Field
The field consisted of 144 competitors: 135 professionals and 9 amateurs. An 18-hole stroke play qualifying round was held on Monday, 21 July for players who were not already exempt.

Nationalities in the field

Past champions in the field

Made the cut

Missed the cut

Past winners of The Open Championship in the field 
The field included two former winners of The Open Championship. One of them made the cut;  1975, 1977, 1980, 1982 and 1983 Open champion Tom Watson (tied 10th). 1985 Open champion Sandy Lyle did not make the cut.

Round summaries

First round
Thursday, 24 July 2014

Bernhard Langer posted a six-under-par 65 on day one to lead by two shots.

Second round
Friday 25 July 2014

Langer extended his lead to seven shots after a second round 66, entering the weekend at 131 (−11). Colin Montgomerie and Chris Williams finished the second round in a tie for 2nd at 138 (−4). Tom Pernice Jr. shot the round of the day, a 64 (−7), which included eight birdies and one bogey.

Amateurs: Lutz (+2), Zahringer (+7), Reynard (+8), Ambridge (+17), Bell (+17), Kinghorn (+18), Lehew (+25), Gold (+26), Cooper (+32)

Third round
Saturday, 26 July 2014

Langer shot a third consecutive round in the 60s with a third round 68 (−3), and extended his lead to eight shots over Rick Gibson, who shot a 66 (−5). Colin Montgomerie fell back into a tie for seventh place after shooting a 40 (+4) on the back nine and finishing the day with a 72 (+1).

Amateurs: Lutz (+4), Zahringer (+4)

Final round
Sunday, 27 July 2014

Bernhard Langer shot a final round 67 (−4) to win his fourth senior major championship and his second Senior Open Championship by 13 strokes. Langer finished with a record score of −18, breaking the previous scoring record by one stroke, which had been held by Tom Watson and Carl Mason. Scoring was difficult on Sunday as only 10 players broke par during the final round, and Langer's four-under-par 67 was the lowest score of the day.  Colin Montgomerie recovered from a third round 72 (+1) with a final round 69 (−2), finishing in second place. Rick Gibson finished in a tie for third after a final round 75 (+4), which included seven bogies and three birdies. Bob Tway also struggled in the final round, shooting a 76 (+5), which included two double bogies and a triple bogey on the par-4 3rd hole. Dunlap, Watson, Williams, and Couples shot final rounds of 75, 77, 80, and 78, respectively.

Source:
Amateurs: Lutz (+11),  Zahringer (+13)

Scorecard

Cumulative tournament scores, relative to par

Source:

Notes and references

External links
Results on European Tour website
Results on PGA Tour website

Senior major golf championships
Golf tournaments in Wales
Senior Open Championship
Senior Open Championship
Senior Open Championship